Nizhny Ubukun (Doodo Bükhen) is a rural locality (a selo) in Selenginsky District, Republic of Buryatia, Russia. The population was 207 as of 2010.

Geography 
Nizhny Ubukun is located 42 km northeast of Gusinoozyorsk (the district's administrative centre) by road. Khargana is the nearest rural locality.

References 

Rural localities in Selenginsky District